The Institute of Management Sciences (also known as IMSciences) is a public sector government owned autonomous institution recognized by Higher Education Commission Islamabad and working under NWFP Ordinance No. XXXVII of 2002. The institute was founded in 1995 from elements of the University of Peshawar. It is ranked at 7th in the Business Category by Higher Education Commission of Pakistan.

The institute is located in the Hayatabad area of Peshawar and is organised into four faculties - management sciences, computer sciences, information technology and liberal arts.

It is recognised as a degree-awarding institution by the Higher Education Commission of Pakistan and is chartered by the Government of Khyber Pakhtoonkhwa.

The institute has two incubation centers named, IM|Durshal which is a combined program of KPITB and IM|Sciences, and Business Incubation Centre (BIC).

Degrees offered

The institute has been granting degrees since 2005, including in the following fields:

 Management
 Computer Science and Information Technology
 Data Science and Software Engineering 
 Planning and Policy Analysis
 Banking
 Finance and Accounting
 Marketing
 Health Service and Hospital Management
 Local Government and Public Enterprises
 Applied Economics
 Social Sciences
 English (Literature & Linguistics)

The institute also offers a "split site PhD" program with the Southampton Management School at the University of Southampton in the United Kingdom.

References

Educational institutions established in 1955
Educational institutions in Pakistan
Universities and colleges in Peshawar
1955 establishments in Pakistan
Hayatabad
Business schools in Pakistan